Aechmea biflora is a species of plant in the family Bromeliaceae. It is endemic to Ecuador.  Its natural habitat is subtropical or tropical moist montane forests. The species name means "2-flowered," referring to two flowers in each fascicle.

Cultivars 
 × Neomea 'Buchanan's Nebula'
 × Neomea 'Caldera'
 × Neomea 'Chiriqui'
 × Neomea 'Light Years'
 × Neomea 'Mars Rising'
 × Neomea 'Mundillo'
 × Neomea 'Solar Flare'
 × Nidumea 'Kathleen'
 × Nidumea 'Pepe'

References

External links

2006 IUCN Red List of Threatened Species.   Downloaded on 20 August 2007.
BSI Cultivar Registry Retrieved 11 October 2009

biflora
Endemic flora of Ecuador
Vulnerable plants
Plants described in 1972
Taxonomy articles created by Polbot